Tharay Sithu Aung Ko Win (also known as Saya Kyaung) is a Burmese business tycoon and former school teacher. He owns several businesses in Myanmar under the Kanbawza (KBZ) brand in the finance, agriculture, aviation, manufacturing, and tourism sectors.

Education 
He graduated with BSc in Chemistry from Mandalay University.

Career
Aung Ko Win was a teacher, then he switched to tutoring before going into trading and mining. He has close connections to General Maung Aye, the second in command of the former military junta, the State Peace and Development Council (SPDC). While Maung Aye was a commander in jade-mining region of Shan State, Maung Aye offered Aung Ko Win jade and gem mining concessions. 

His trading and mining business prospered, and two years later, he bought the banking operation. Then he moved KBZ and his family to Yangon in the late 1990s, when there were only 4 branches. Now there are 485, and KBZ expects to reach 500 by the end of 2017.

He has also served as the chairman of the Myanmar Jades, Gems & Jewelry Entrepreneurs, Republic of The Union of Myanmar Federation of Chambers of Commerce & Industry (UMFCCI), Myanmar Football Federation, Myanmar Anti-Narcotics Association and Border Area Development Association, Myanmar.

Personal life
He is married to Nang Than Htwe, the niece of Win Myint, a former State Peace and Development Council official. He has 3 daughters, Nang Lang Kham (b. 1988), Nang Kham Noung (b. 1991), and Nang Mo Hom (b. 1996). His wife serves as Deputy Chairman of KBZ, while his daughters serve as directors within the company. Two daughters, Nang Lang Kham and Nang Kham Noung, serve as Deputy CEOs of KBZ Bank. His brother-in-law, Major-General Zaw Myint Naing was appointed vice-governor of the Central Bank of Myanmar in August 2022.

Awards and honours

Awards 
On 4 January 2021, the President of Myanmar awarded him the country's highest Medal of Honor and Title "Tharay Sithu" in the category of "Pyidaungsu Sithu Thingaha" (Order of the Union of Myanmar).

Aung Ko Win was awarded the "State Excellence Award"  (2013, 2014, 2015) from the President of Myanmar for contributions to Myanmar and "Special Honorary State Excellence Award" 2014 and 2015 for the largest contribution to the Myanmar State Tax & Revenue Department and for community donations.

In 2015, Aung Ko Win accepted "The Banker of the Year Award" in Asia 2015 award at a ceremony held at the London Stock Exchange on 3 December. In 2016, he accepted "The Banker Awards" (2016) ceremony held at the Hilton London Bankside Hotel in London on 7 December.

In 2017, he was awarded with the ASEAN's "The Legacy Award" conferred on him by the ASEAN Business Advisory Council-ABAC on 6 September in Manila, Philippines.

Honours
  Tharay Sithu of the Pyidaungsu Sithu Thingaha Order of the Union of Myanmar

References

Burmese businesspeople
Mandalay University alumni